The 1st Marine Aircraft Wing is an aviation unit of the United States Marine Corps that serves as the Aviation Combat Element of the III Marine Expeditionary Force.  The wing is headquartered at Marine Corps Air Station Futenma on the island of Okinawa, Japan.  Activated in 1941, the wing has seen heavy combat operations during World War II, the Korean War, and the Vietnam War.


Commanding generals

See also

 List of Historically Important U.S. Marines
 List of United States Marine Corps aircraft wings
 List of active United States Marine Corps aircraft squadrons
 List of 1st Marine Division Commanders
 List of 2nd Marine Division Commanders
 List of 3rd Marine Division Commanders

References

 Inline citations

1 List